Thuthapuzha River is one of the main tributaries of the Bharathapuzha River. The source of the river is in the Silent Valley hills. It flows through Malappuram-Palakkad district border. In Mannarkkad region the river is named as Kunthipuzha that flows through the Silent Valley National Park. 
Elamkulam, Thiruvegappura, Veliyakulam and Pulamanthole are places of importance situated on the bank of this river.

Tributaries
There are four main tributaries of the Thuthapuzha River: 
Kunthippuzha
Kanjirappuzha
Ambankadavu
Thuppanadippuzha

See also
Bharathapuzha 
Gayathripuzha
Kalpathipuzha
Kannadipuzha

References 

Rivers of Palakkad district
Bharathappuzha